C. oblonga may refer to:
 Callitris oblonga, a conifer species
 Cocculina oblonga, an orthogastropod mollusk species in the genus Cocculina
 Cydonia oblonga, a medicinal plant species

See also
 Oblonga